The MEI Mercury is a family of medium-range low-impulse 40mm grenade (40×46mmSR) developed by Martin Electronics, Inc. (MEI) that can reach out to 800 meters. The rounds are a fixed type ammunition designed to be fired from a 40 mm Grenade Launcher such as the M79, M203, M320 (attached to the M16 rifle or M4 carbine), or Milkor MK-1.

Technical information

High explosive dual purpose
 Body material: Steel
 Fuse: SF801/M550
 Charge: 86g A5
 Weapons: M79, M203, Milkor MK-1 launchers
 Penetration: 90 mm mild steel at normal impact with anti-personnel fragmentation
 Range: (max.) 800 m
 Muzzle velocity: 110 m/s

Covert infrared marker
 IR footprint: 28'L × 5'W
 IR viability: 15+ nm
 Range: (max.) 650 m

See also 

 MEI HELLHOUND
 M32 Grenade Launcher (Milkor MGL)
 M79 grenade launcher
 China Lake NATIC (EX-41)
 M203 grenade launcher
 M320 grenade launcher
 MK19
 SAG-30

External links 
 Martin Electronics, Inc. Home Page
 Future Weapons: MEI Mercury 40MM Grenade
 MEI Mercury 40 mm MV HEDP and MVT grenades (United States), 40 x 46-51 MV Grenades
 Coming out of their shell
 40 mm Mercury Covert Infrared Marker
 MEI product guide pdf 

Grenades
Ammunition
Projectiles
40×46mmSR Mercury